Jana Oľhová (born 31 December 1959) is a Slovak actress. At the 2008 Sun in a Net Awards she won the category of Best Supporting Actress for her performance in the film Music. Oľhová won another accolade at the Sun in a Net Awards, again for Best Supporting Actress, in 2014 for her performance in the 2013 film Fine, Thanks (Ďakujem, dobře).

Selected filmography 
The Millennial Bee (1983)
Želary (2003)
Bathory (2008)
Music (2008)
Odsúdené (television, 2010)
Surviving Life (2010)
The House (2011)
Fine, Thanks (2013)
Búrlivé víno (television, 2013–2017)
The Seven Ravens (2015)
Little Crusader (2017)
Buko (2022)

References

External links

1959 births
Living people
Slovak film actresses
Slovak stage actresses
Slovak television actresses
People from Myjava
20th-century Slovak actresses
21st-century Slovak actresses
Sun in a Net Awards winners